Frogner Manor is an oil on canvas painting by Johan Christian Dahl, executed in 1842, now in a private US collection. It shows the eponymous Frogner Manor and its surrounding landscape gardens.

The painting was executed in 1842 on behalf of landowner Benjamin Wegner, the owner of Frogner Manor. Dahl was already a world-famous artist, and was on one of his rare visits to Norway, where he was almost treated like if he was in state visit. He was then a guest at Frogner Manor and was asked to create the painting. The canvas was exhibited in the Art Association of Christiania in 1852. It was in a private collection in Dresden, Germany, until 1945 and has a somewhat enigmatic provenance. In 1998, it was sold by 3.3 million NOK to a Norwegian-American couple through Count Wedels Plass Auctions, which was then the Norwegian auction record for a painting at the time. The work was exhibited for a time at Frogner Manor, at the current Oslo City Museum, through loans from the new owners. It is now in a private collection in the United States.

Sources
 Auksjon over klassisk kunst (s. 62–63), auksjonskatalog, Grev Wedels Plass Auksjoner, mandag 27. April 1998

1842 paintings
Paintings by Johan Christian Dahl
Landscape paintings
Birds in art
Bridges in art
Water in art